Lesnoy is a rural locality (a settlement) in Gorod Svorodino of Skovorodinsky District, Amur Oblast, Russia. The population was 332 as of 2018. There are 8 streets.

Geography 
Lesnoy is located on the Bolshoy Never River, 18 km southwest of Skovorodino (the district's administrative centre) by road. Skovorodino is the nearest rural locality.

References 

Rural localities in Skovorodinsky District